Nick Kaufman (born 17 May 1968) is a British-born Israeli lawyer specializing in international criminal law and international arbitration.

Education and early career
Kaufman was educated at King Edward's School, Birmingham and Magdalene College, Cambridge. He was called to the Bar of England and Wales in 1991, and to the Bar of Israel in 1995. He later attended the École Nationale d'Administration (ENA) in Paris for post-graduate studies.
He formerly worked as senior district attorney in the Office of the District Attorney of Jerusalem from 1996, later as a prosecutor at the International Criminal Tribunal for the Former Yugoslavia and, subsequently, at the International Criminal Court in The Hague until he left to become defense counsel. He also served as a military judge in Israel's military courts in the West Bank.

Clients
Kaufman has advised and represented a number of high-profile international personalities including Jean-Pierre Bemba (the ex-Vice President of the Democratic Republic of the Congo), Callixte Mbarushimana - the alleged Executive Secretary of the Democratic Forces for the Liberation of Rwanda ("FDLR"), Kang Kek Iew a.k.a. “Duch” (the Commander of the Khmer Rouge prison – Tuol Sleng (“S-21”), Saadi Gaddafi, his sister Aisha Gaddafi  and Charles Blé Goudé.

In 2020 Kaufman was hired to defend Malka Leifer, an Israeli citizen charged with 74 counts of sexual abuse, in hearings to approve her extradition to Australia. He argued that publicity over her case meant she would not receive a fair trial in Australia, that she would not be able to maintain her religious beliefs in an Australian prison, and that the prosecution "failed to prove … a lack of consent".

Victims' Advocacy 
In addition to defence work, Kaufman has acted on behalf of various groups of victims, especially in Africa. In 2014, Kaufman called for the prosecution of Agathon Rwasa and Pasteur Habimana of the National Forces of Liberation ("FNL") in Burundi on account of their alleged responsibility for the Gatumba Massacre in 2004. His pro-active and, at times, aggressive representation of Darfur victims at the International Criminal Court in the case against Omar al-Bashir of Sudan has earned him the sobriquet "the Octopus Lawyer". Kaufman was particularly critical of the decision of the International Criminal Court Prosecutor, Fatou Bensouda, to stop her investigations in Darfur in December 2014.

References

Alumni of Magdalene College, Cambridge
Israeli lawyers
Living people
1968 births